Ruddell Bird "Rudd" Weatherwax (September 23, 1907 – February 25, 1985) was an American actor, animal trainer, and breeder. He and his brother Frank are best remembered for training dogs for motion pictures and television. Their collie, Pal, became the original Lassie, handled by Rudd for the 1943 Metro-Goldwyn-Mayer film Lassie Come Home. He also handled the dogs for the Lassie television series which ran from 1954 to 1974, and trained Spike for the 1957 feature film Old Yeller. After his death, his son, Robert, took over the training of the animals.

Weatherwax was also responsible for training the official New York Mets’ team mascot in the 1960s, a beagle named Homer.

Biography
Weatherwax was born in Engle, New Mexico Territory, the son of Anna Elisa (née Wallis) and Walter Smiley Weatherwax.

Pal became a movie star through a weather-related event. MGM, which had decided to use a show collie trained by Frank Inn in the movie, took advantage of a massive flooding of the Sacramento River in northern California to obtain some spectacular footage for the film. Inn's collie was still in training, so MGM hired Pal as a stand-in for the river scene. Although the work was considered complicated for an animal actor, the dog performed exceptionally well. According to legend, after seeing the first prints, MGM head Louis B. Mayer stated that "Pal had entered the water, but Lassie had come out," and a new star was born.

MGM owned the rights to Lassie's name, but when the series of films ended, Weatherwax obtained those rights in lieu of his final year's salary and a little additional money. Therefore, he benefited from those rights during the program's 17-year run on CBS and additional broadcasts in syndication.

Legacy
Weatherwax was posthumously inducted into the New Mexico Entertainment Hall of Fame in 2012. He had two sons, Jackie
 and Bob. He was the uncle of Ken Weatherwax, who played Pugsley Addams in The Addams Family television series.

References

Book
FOUR FEET TO FAME: A Hollywood Dog Trainer's Journey, by Bob Weatherwax and Richard Lester. Published 2017 by BearManor Media. .

External links

1907 births
1985 deaths
American male film actors
Burials at Valhalla Memorial Park Cemetery
Dog trainers
Male actors from New Mexico
Male actors from Hollywood, Los Angeles
Place of death missing
People from Sierra County, New Mexico
20th-century American male actors